This is a list of former CBC/SRC television transmitters across Canada that were used by the Canadian Broadcasting Corporation. Due to budget cuts, the CBC decommissioned its 620 over-the-air analogue television transmission network on July 31, 2012.

City of License | Network | Callsign | Channel

Alberta
 
Athabasca CBC CBXT-1 8 
Banff CBC CBRT-1 5 
Beaverlodge CBC CBXAT-14 4 
Bellevue CBC CBRT-10 57 
Bonnyville SRC CBXFT-1 6 
Burmis CBC CBRT-8 47 
Calgary  SRC CBRFT  16 
Cardston CBC CBRT-12 6 
Chateh CBC CBXAT-7 5 
Coleman CBC CBRT-11 17 
Coronation CBC CBXT-14 10 
Coutts/Milk River CBC CBRT-16 4 
Cowley CBC CBRT-15 27 
Daysland CBC CBXT-11 40 
Drumheller CBC CBRT-14 3 
Drumheller CBRT-2 6 
Etzikom CBC CBCA-TV-1 12 
Falher SRC CBXFT-2 6 
Forestburg CBC CBXT-12 52 
Fort Chipewyan CBC CBXBT 10 
Fort McMurray CBC CBXT-6 9 
Fort McMurray SRC CBXFT-6 12 
Fort Vermilion CBC CBXAT-5 11 
Fox Creek CBC CBXT-7 5 
Fox Lake CBC CBXAT-10 9 
Grande Prairie CBC CBXAT 10 
Grande Prairie SRC CBXFT-8 19 
Harvie Heights CBC CBRT-13 22 
High Level CBC CBXAT-4 8 
High Prairie CBC CBXAT-2 2 
Hinton CBC CBXT-3 8 
Hinton SRC CBXFT-7 3 
Jasper CBC CBXT-4 5 
Jean D'Or CBC CBXAT-9 13 
Lac La Biche CBC CBXT-5 10 
Lake Louise CBC CBRT-4 12 
Lethbridge CBC CBRT-6 10 
Lethbridge SRC CBXFT-3 23 
Manning CBC CBXAT-3 12 
Medicine Hat SRC CBXFT-11 34 
Paddle Prairie CBC CBXAT-6 9 
Peace River CBC CBXAT-1 7 
Peace River SRC CBXFT-5 9 
Pincher Creek CBC CBRT-9 15 
Plamondon/Lac Labich CBC CBXT-8 4 
Plamondon/Lac Labich SRC CBXFT-9 22 
Rainbow Lake CBC CBXAT-8 11 
Red Deer CBC CBXT-13 22 
Red Deer SRC CBXFT-4 31 
Rosemary CBC CBRT-5 11 
Slave Lake CBC CBXAT-11 11 
Wabasca CBC CBXAT-12 7 
Waterton Park CBC CBRT-7 4 
Whitecourt CBC CBXT-2 9

British Columbia

Alert Bay CBC CBUT-16 11 
Bamfield CBC CBUO-TV 4 
Bella Bella CBC CBUIT-1 13 
Bella Coola CBC CBUIT-3 7 
Blue River CBC CBUJ-TV 7 
Bonnington Falls CBC CBUDT 13 
Bowen Island CBC CBUT-4 13 
Braeloch CBC CBUT-39 15 
Burns Lake CBC CBCY-TV-1 4 
Campbell River CBC CBUT-8 3 
Canal Flats CBC CBUBT-1 12 
Castlegar CBC CBUAT-2 3 
Chetwynd CBC CBCD-TV-2 7 
Chilliwack CBC CBUT-2 3 
Chilliwack CBUT-25 36 
Chilliwack SRC CBUFT-6 14 
Christina Lake CBC CBUAT-7 13 
Coal Harbour CBC CBUT-20 8 
Cranbrook CBC CBUBT-7 10 
Crawford Bay CBC CBUCT-1 5 
Crescent Valley CBC CBUCT-4 33 
Creston CBC CBUCT-2 3 
Dawson Creek SRC CBUFT-5 33 
Donald CBC CBUBT-4 3 
Enderby CBC CBUT-44 26 
Fernie CBC CBUBT-8 21 
Fernie CBUBT-9 8 
Field CBC CBUBT-13 11 
Fort Nelson CBC CBUGT 8 
Fort St John CBC CBCD-TV-3 9 
Fruitvale CBC CBUAT-3 9 
Gold River CBC CBUT-12 7 
Golden CBC CBUBT-2 13 
Grand Forks CBC CBUT-37 5 
Greenwood CBC CBUT-31 31 
Hagensborg CBC CBUIT-4 11 
Harrison Hot Spring CBC CBUT-23 13 
Hope CBC CBUT-6 9 
Houston CBC CBCY-TV 2 
Invermere CBC CBUBT-3 2 
Kamloops SRC CBUFT-2 50 
Kelowna CBC CBUT-38 45 
Kelowna SRC CBUFT-1 21 
Kitimat SRC CBUFT-7 8 
Madeira Park CBC CBUT-36 31 
Mcbride CBC CBUHT-3 6 
Midway CBC CBUT-32 7 
Moricetown CBC CBCY-TV-3 4 
Moyie CBC CBUBT-14 6 
Nelson CBC CBUCT 9 
New Denver CBC CBUCT-6 17 
Osoyoos CBC CBUT-42 6 
Pemberton CBC CBUPT 4 
Penticton CBC CBUT-40 17 
Phoenix CBC CBUT-30 15 
Port Alberni CBC CBUT-3 4 
Port Alice CBC CBUT-17 10 
Port Hardy CBC CBUT-19 6 
Port Mcneill CBC CBUT-18 2 
Pouce Coupe CBC CBCD-TV-1 7 
Prince George SRC CBUFT-4 4 
Princeton CBC CBRG-TV 6 
Purden Lake CBC CBUHT-1 10 
Radium Hot Springs CBC CBUBT-5 17 
Revelstoke CBC CBUT-46 11 
Rock Creek CBC CBUT-33 33 
Ruby Creek CBC CBUT-26 25 
Salmo CBC CBUAT-5 10 
Salmon Arm CBC CBUT-43 3 
Sayward CBC CBUT-10 4 
Sechelt CBC CBUT-35 18 
Slocan CBC CBUCT-5 39 
Smithers CBC CBCY-TV-2 5 
Sooke CBC CBUT-28 3 
Sparwood CBC CBUBT-10 11 
Squamish/Bracken CBC CBUT-5 11 
Squamish/Bracken CBUT-34 35 
Tahsis CBC CBUT-14 9 
Taylor CBC CBCD-TV-4 12 
Terrace SRC CBUFT-3 11 
Tete Jaune CBC CBUHT-4 10 
Tofino CBC CBUT-22 10 
Trail CBC CBUAT 11 
Ucluelet CBC CBUT-7 7 
Valemount CBC CBUHT-5 12 
Vernon CBC CBUT-41 18 
Whistler CBC CBUWT 13 
Winlaw CBC CBUCT-3 12 
Woss Camp CBC CBUT-13 12

Manitoba

Brandon SRC CBWFT-10 21 
Brochet CBC CBDE-TV 9 
Churchill CBC CHFC-TV 8 
Cross Lake CBC CBWNT 12 
Dauphin CBC CBWST 8 
Easterville CBC CBWHT-2 11 
Fairford CBC CBWGT-2 7 
Fisher Branch CBC CBWGT 10 
Flin Flon CBC CBWBT 10 
Flin Flon SRC CBWFT-2 3 
Gillam CBC CBWLT 8 
Gods Lake Narrows CBC CBWXT 13 
Grand Rapids CBC CBWHT 8 
Jackhead CBC CBWGT-1 5 
Lac Du Bonnet CBC CBWT-2 4 
Leaf Rapids CBC CBWQT 13 
Little Grand Rapids CBC CBWZT 9 
Lynn Lake CBC CBWRT 8 
Mafeking CBC CBWYT 2 
Manigotagan CBC CBWGT-3 22 
Mccusker Lake CBC CBWUT 10 
Moose Lake CBC CBWIT-1 9 
Nelson House CBC CBWPT 11 
Norway House CBC CBWOT 9 
Oak Lake SRC CBWFT-12 32 
Oxford House CBC CBWVT 8 
Pine Falls SRC CBWFT-6 11 
Piney CBC CBWT-3 29 
Poplar River CBC CBDI-TV 13 
Pukatawagan CBC CBWBT-1 11 
Shamattawa CBC CBDG-TV 9 
Snow Lake CBC CBWKT 8 
South Indian Lake CBC CBWQT-1 10 
Ste Rose Du Lac SRC CBWFT-4 3 
St-Lazare SRC CBWFT-3 13 
The Pas CBC CBWIT 7 
The Pas SRC CBWFT-1 6 
Thompson CBC CBWTT 7 
Thompson SRC CBWFT-5 5 
Waasagomach CBC CBWWT 9 
Wabowden CBC CBWMT 10

New Brunswick

Allardville SRC CBAFT-3 3 
Boiestown CBC CBAT-TV-6 13 
Bon Accord CBC CBAT-TV-1 6 
Campbellton CBC CBAT-TV-4 4 
Campbellton SRC CBAFT-7 9 
Doaktown CBC CBAT-TV-5 8 
Edmundston SRC CBAFT-2 13 
Fredericton SRC CBAFT-1 5 
Fredericton CBAFT-10 19 
Grand Falls SRC CBAFT-4 12 
Kedgwick SRC CBAFT-9 44 
Miramichi CBC CBAT-TV-3 6 
Moncton CBC CBAT-TV-2 7 
Saint John  CBC CBAT-TV 4 
St-Quentin SRC CBAFT-8 21

Newfoundland and Labrador

Baie Verte CBC CBNAT-1 3 
Baie Verte CBNAT-24 12 
Bay L'Argent CBC CBNT-27 8 
Belleoram CBC CBNT-23 7 
Bonne Bay CBC CBYT-3 2 
Brent's Cove CBC CBNAT-18 10 
Buchans CBC CBNAT-2 13 
Carmanville CBC CBNAT-7 7 
Cartwright CBC CBNT-21 9 
Churchill Falls CBC CBNLT-1 9 
Churchill Falls SRC CBFT-11 13 
Clarenville CBC CBNT-10 7 
Coachman's Cove CBC CBNAT-16 8 
Conche CBC CBNAT-8 12 
Corner Brook CBC CBYT  5 
Cow Head CBC CBYT-6 8 
Deer Lake CBC CBYAT 12 
Elliston CBC CBNT-7 4 
Fermeuse CBC CBNT-5 11 
Ferryland CBC CBNT-38 4 
Fleur De Lys CBC CBNAT-20 5 
Fogo Island CBC CBNAT-6 2 
Fortune CBC CBNT-33 9 
Fox Harbour CBC CBNAT-10 7 
Gambo CBC CBNT-14 8 
Gillams CBC CBYT-12 13 
Glovertown CBC CBNT-13 3 
Goose Bay CBC CFLA-TV  8 
Grand Falls CBC CBNAT 11 
Hampden CBC CBNAT-23 13 
Harbour Breton CBC CBNT-22 13 
Harbour Le Cou CBC CBYT-10 5 
Harbour Mille CBC CBNT-29 13 
Harbour Round CBC CBNAT-19 12 
Hawke's Bay CBC CBYT-9 4 
Hermitage CBC CBNT-24 4 
Hickman's Harbour CBC CBNT-18 4 
Hopedale CBC CBNHT 9 
Irishtown CBC CBYT-2 7 
La Scie CBC CBNAT-21 9 
Labrador City CBC CBNLT  13 
Labrador City SRC CBFT-12 11 
Lamaline CBC CBNT-35 18 
Lark Harbour CBC CBYT-13 3 
Lawn CBC CBNT-36 6 
Little Heart's Ease CBC CBNT-8 11 
Lord's Cove CBC CBNT-34 9 
Lumsden CBC CBNT-20 12 
Makkovik CBC CBNMT 9 
Marystown CBC CBNT-3 5 
Millertown CBC CBNAT-5 9 
Ming's Bight CBC CBNAT-14 10 
Mt. St Margaret CBC CBNAT-9 9 
Musgrave Harbour CBC CBNAT-11 9 
Musgravetown CBC CBNT-17 9 
Nain CBC CBNBT 9 
North West Brook CBC CBNT-11 4 
Pacquet CBC CBNAT-17 6 
Petty Harbour CBC CBNT-37 13 
Placentia CBC CBNT-2 12 
Port Au Port SRC CBFNT 13 
Port Aux Basques CBC CBYT-4 3 
Port Blandford CBC CBNT-32 2 
Port Hope Simpson CBC CBNAT-12 12 
Port Rexton CBC CBNT-1 13 
Portland Creek CBC CBYT-8 13 
Postville CBC CBNPT 9 
Ramea CBC CBNT-25 13 
Random Island CBC CBNT-19 43 
Riverhead CBC CBNT-40 16 
Roddickton CBC CBNAT-22 11 
Rose Blanche CBC CBYT-11 9 
Seal Cove CBC CBNAT-15 7 
Springdale CBC CBNAT-13 13 
St Alban's CBC CBNT-4 9 
St Andrew's CBC CBYT-5 6 
St Anthony CBC CBNAT-4 6 
St Bernard's CBC CBNT-30 6 
St Jones Within CBC CBNT-12 9 
St Lawrence CBC CBNT-28 12 
St Mary's CBC CBNT-6 10 
St Vincent's CBC CBNT-26 7 
St. John's SRC CBFJ-TV 4 
Stephenville CBC CBYT-1 8 
Sunnyside CBC CBNT-41 9 
Swift Current CBC CBNT-31 5 
Trepassey CBC CBNT-39 4 
Trinity CBC CBNT-16 2 
Trout River CBC CBYT-7 13 
Wellington CBC CBNT-15 24 
Wesleyville CBC CBNT-9 5 
York Harbour CBC CBYT-14 12

Nova Scotia

Aspen CBC CBHT-14 5 
Bay St Lawrence CBC CBIT-17 13 
Blue Mountain CBC CBHT-18 5 
Caledonia CBC CBHT-9 2 
Cheticamp CBC CBIT-2 2 
Cheticamp SRC CBHFT-4 10 
Country Harbour CBC CBHT-15 6 
Digby CBC CBHT-7 52 
Digby SRC CBHFT-6 58 
Dingwall CBC CBIT-16 12 
Garden Of Eden CBC CBHT-19 17 
Goshen CBC CBHT-13 2 
Halifax SRC CBHFT 13 
Ingonish CBC CBIT-15 2 
Inverness CBC CBIT-19 8 
Liverpool CBC CBHT-1 12 
Lochaber CBC CBHT-12 33 
Mabou CBC CBIT-4 10 
Margaree CBC CBIT-5 11 
Middle River CBC CBIT-20 9 
Middleton CBC CBHT-6 8 
Middleton SRC CBHFT-5 46 
Mulgrave CBC CBHT-11 12 
Mulgrave SRC CBHFT-2 7 
New Glasgow CBC CBHT-5 4 
New Glasgow SRC CBHFT-7 15 
North East Margaree CBC CBIT-6 13 
Pleasant Bay CBC CBIT-3 8 
Sheet Harbour CBC CBHT-4 11 
Shelburne CBC CBHT-2 7 
Sherbrooke CBC CBHT-16 4 
Sunnybrae CBC CBHT-17 6 
Sydney CBC CBIT 5 
Sydney SRC CBHFT-3 13 
Truro CBC CBHT-8 55 
Weymouth CBC CBHT-10 24 
Weymouth SRC CBHFT-8 34 
Whycocomagh CBC CBIT-18 10 
Yarmouth CBC CBHT-3 11 
Yarmouth SRC CBHFT-1 3

Northwest Territories

Aklavik CBC CBEX-TV 13 
Deline CBC CBETT 9 
Fort Good Hope CBC CBEST 9 
Fort Mcpherson CBC CHAK-TV-1 13 
Fort Providence CBC CBEBT-3 13 
Fort Resolution CBC CBEV-TV 9 
Fort Simpson CBC CBEGT 9 
Fort Smith CBC CBEAT 8 
Hay River CBC CBEBT-1 7 
Inuvik CBC CHAK-TV  6 
Norman Wells CBC CBEDT 9 
Rae-Edzo CBC CFYK-TV-1 10 
Tuktoyaktuk CBC CBEPT 8

Nunavut

Arviat CBC CBEHT 9 
Baker Lake CBC CBEIT 9 
Cambridge Bay CBC CBENT 9 
Cape Dorset CBC CBEJT 9 
Gjoa Haven CBC CBERT 9 
Igloolik CBC CBII-TV 9 
Iqaluit CBC CFFB-TV  8 
Kugluktuk CBC CBEOT 9 
Pangnirtung CBC CBEKT 9 
Pond Inlet CBC CBELT 9 
Rankin Inlet CBC CBECT 9 
Resolute CBC CBEMT 9 
Taloyoak CBC CBEQT 9

Ontario

Armstrong CBC CBLIT 10 
Atikokan CBC CBWCT-1 7 
Attawapiskat CBC CBLET 12 
Barry's Bay CBC CBOT-2 19 
Beardmore CBC CBLAT-5 9 
Belleville SRC CBLFT-13 15 
Big Trout Lake CBC CBWT-1 13 
Chapleau CBC CBCU-TV 7 
Chapleau SRC CBLFT-22 13 
Chatham CBC CBLN-TV-3 64
Chatham SRC CBLFT-10 48 
Dryden CBC CBWDT 9 
Dryden SRC CBWFT-9 6 
Dubreuilville SRC CBLFT-24 11 
Ear Falls CBC CBWJT 13 
Elliot Lake CBC CBEC-TV 7 
Elliot Lake SRC CBLFT-6 12 
Espanola SRC CBLFT-7 4 
Fort Albany CBC CBLDT 8 
Fort Frances CBC CBWCT 5 
Fort Frances SRC CBWFT-11 15 
Fort Hope CBC CBLHT 12 
Foymount CBC CBOT-1 14 
Fraserdale CBC CBLCT 7 
Geraldton CBC CBLGT 13 
Geraldton SRC CBLFT-26 7 
Gogama SRC CBLFT-21 12 
Hearst CBC CBCC-TV 5 
Hearst SRC CBLFT-5 7 
Hornepayne CBC CBLAT-6 13 
Huntsville CBC CBLT-TV-2 8 
Ignace CBC CBWDT-2 13 
Kapuskasing CBC CBLT-9 2 
Kapuskasing SRC CBLFT-4 12 
Kearns CBC CBLT-8 2 
Kenora CBC CBWAT 8 
Kenora SRC CBWFT-7 2 
Kingston SRC CBLFT-14 32 
Kitchener CBC CBLN-TV-1 56
Kitchener SRC CBLFT-8 61 
Little Current CBC CBCE-TV 16 
London CBC CBLN-TV 40
London SRC CBLFT-9 53 
Manitouwadge CBC CBLAT-1 8 
Manitouwadge SRC CBLFT-25 15 
Marathon CBC CBLAT-4 11 
Mattawa SRC CBLFT-27 26 
Maynooth CBC CBOT-4 51 
Mcarthur's Mills CBC CBOT-5 33 
Moosonee CBC CBCO-TV-1 9 
Nipigon CBC CBLK-TV 16 
Nipigon SRC CBLFT-19 26 
Normandale CBC CBLN-TV-6 44 
North Bay CBC CBLT-4 4 
Osnaburgh CBC CBWDT-4 13 
Parry Sound CBC CBLT-TV-3 18 
Pembroke CBC CBOT-6 3 
Penetanguishene SRC CBLFT-15 34 
Peterborough SRC CBLFT-12 44 
Pickle Lake CBC CBWDT-5 9 
Pikangikum CBC CBWDT-6 7 
Red Lake CBC CBWET 10 
Sandy Lake CBC CBWDT-7 10 
Sarnia-Oil Springs CBC CBLN-TV-2 34 
Sarnia-Oil Springs SRC CBLFT-17 17 
Sault Ste Marie CBC CBLT-5 5 
Sault Ste Marie SRC CBLFT-20 26 
Savant Lake CBC CBWDT-3 8 
Sioux Lookout CBC CBWDT-1 12 
Sioux Narrows CBC CBWAT-1 4 
Sturgeon Falls SRC CBLFT-1 7 
Sudbury CBC CBLT-6 9 
Sudbury SRC CBLFT-2 13 
Temagami CBC CBCQ-TV-1 15 
Thunder Bay SRC CBLFT-18 12 
Timmins CBC CBLT-7  6 
Timmins SRC CBLFT-3 9 
Wawa CBC CBLAT-3 9 
Wawa SRC CBLFT-23 16 
White River CBC CBLAT-2 12 
Whitney CBC CBOT-3 9 
Wiarton CBC CBLN-TV-5 20 
Windsor  SRC CBEFT  35 
Wingham CBC CBLN-TV-4 45

Prince Edward Island
Charlottetown SRC CBAFT-5 31 
Elmira CBC CBCT-2 11 
St Edward CBC CBCT-1 4 
St Edward SRC CBAFT-6 9

Quebec

Aguanish SRC CBST-7 8 
Alma CBC CBJET-1 32 
Baie-Comeau CBC CBMIT 28 
Baie-Comeau SRC CBST-19 7 
Baie-Johan-Beetz SRC CBST-8 7 
Bearn/Fabre SRC CKRN-TV-3 3 
Beauceville SRC CBVT-6 6 
Blanc-Sablon CBC CBMST 5 
Blanc-Sablon SRC CBST-17 3 
Cap-Chat SRC CBGAT-6 2 
Carleton SRC CBGAT-14 2 
Causapscal SRC CBGAT-5 9 
Chandler CBC CBVB-TV 23 
Chandler SRC CBGAT-15 8 
Chapais SRC CBFAT-1 12 
Chapeau SRC CBOFT-1 11 
Chibougamau CBC CBMCT 4 
Chibougamau SRC CBFAT 5 
Chisasibi CBC CBMGT 12 
Chisasibi SRC CBFGT 9 
Clermont SRC CBSAT 21 
Cloridorme SRC CBGAT-16 8 
Escuminac CBC CBVA-TV 18 
Fermont CBC CBMRT 9 
Fermont SRC CBFT-13 7 
Gaspe CBC CBVG-TV 18 
Gaspe SRC CBGAT-17 9 
Gethsemani SRC CBST-9 9 
Grande-Vallee SRC CBGAT-3 6 
Gros-Morne SRC CBGAT-9 4 
Harrington-Harbour CBC CBMUT 13 
Harrington-Harbour SRC CBST-11 8 
Havre-St-Pierre SRC CBST-1 12 
Ile du Havre Aubert SRC CBIMT-1 16 
Iles-de-la-Madeleine CBC CBMYT 7 
Iles-de-la-Madeleine SRC CBIMT 12 
Inukjuak CBC CBVI-TV 13 
Inukjuak SRC CBFI-TV 9 
Kuujjuaq CBC CBMQ-TV 12 
Kuujjuaq SRC CBFQ-TV 9 
Kuujjuarapik CBC CBMK-TV 12 
Kuujjuarapik SRC CBFK-TV 9 
La Tabatiere CBC CBMLT 10 
La Tabatiere SRC CBST-13 4 
La Tuque CBC CBMET 9 
La Tuque SRC CBFT-14 3 
Lac-Etchemin SRC CBVT-4 55 
Lac-Humqui SRC CBGAT-19 24 
Lac-Megantic SRC CBVT-3 12 
L'Anse-a-Valleau SRC CBGAT-18 10 
Les Mechins SRC CBGAT-23 10 
Longue-Pointe-De-Min SRC CBST-18 6 
Malartic CBC CBVD-TV 5 
Maniwaki CBC CBVU-TV 15 
Manouane SRC CBFT-5 5 
Marsoui SRC CBGAT-8 12 
Matane SRC CBGAT 6 
Mistassini (IR)  CBC CBMDT 12 
Mistassini (IR) SRC CBFMT 9 
Mont-Climont SRC CBGAT-1 13 
Mont-Laurier SRC CBFT-2 3 
Mont-Louis SRC CBGAT-10 19 
Mont-Louis CBGAT-4 2 
Mont-St-Michel SRC CBFT-9 16 
Mont-Tremblant SRC CBFT-1 11 
Murdochville CBC CBMMT 21 
Murdochville SRC CBGAT-2 10 
New-Carlisle CBC CBVN-TV 45 
New-Richmond CBC CBVR-TV 27 
Notre-Dame-Des-Monts SRC CBSNT 40 
Notre-Dame-Du-Laus SRC CBOFT-3 10 
Obedjiwan SRC CBFT-6 10 
Old Fort Bay CBC CBMVT 13 
Old Fort Bay SRC CBST-15 7 
Parent SRC CBFT-4 12 
Perce CBC CBVP-TV 14 
Perce SRC CBGAT-20 11 
Port-Daniel CBC CBVF-TV 16 
Port-Daniel CBGAT-21 7 
Povungnituk CBC CBMO-TV 12 
Povungnituk SRC CBFP-TV 9 
Quebec CBC CBVE-TV 11 
Radisson SRC CBFRT 8 
Rapides-des-Joachims SRC CBOFT-2 8 
Riviere-A-Claude SRC CBGAT-13 4 
Riviere-Au-Renard SRC CBGAT-22 2 
Riviere-au-Tonnerre SRC CBST-6 7 
Riviere-St-Paul CBC CBMPT 11 
Riviere-St-Paul SRC CBST-16 21 
Saguenay CBC CBJET 58 
Salluit CBC CBVX-TV 12 
Salluit SRC CBFS-TV 9 
Schefferville CBC CBSET-1  7 
Schefferville SRC CBFT-8 9 
Sept-Iles CBC CBSET 3 
Sept-Iles SRC CBST 13 
Sherbrooke CBC CBMT-3 50 
St-Augustin CBC CBMXT 7 
St-Augustin SRC CBST-14 2 
Ste-Anne-des-Monts SRC CBGAT-11 8 
St-Fabien-de-Panet SRC CBVT-5 13 
St-Marc De Latour SRC CJBR-TV-1 9 
St-Michel-des-Saints SRC CBFT-3 7 
Stoneham SRC CBVT-8 44 
St-Pamphile SRC CBSPT 3 
St-Rene-de-Matane SRC CBGAT-7 30 
Temiscaming SRC CBFST-2 12 
Tete-A-La-Baleine SRC CBST-12 6 
Tewkesbury SRC CBVT-7 7 
Thetford-Mines CBC CBMT-4 32 
Thetford-Mines SRC CBVT-9 21 
Trois-Rivieres CBC CBMT-1 13 
Ville-Marie SRC CKRN-TV-2 6 
Wakeham CBC CBVH-TV 24 
Waskaganish CBC CBMHT 12 
Waskaganish SRC CBFHT 9 
Waswanipi CBC CBVW-TV 8 
Waswanipi SRC CBFV-TV 10 
Wemindji CBC CBMNT 12 
Wemindji SRC CBFWT 9 
Weymont SRC CBFT-7 6

Saskatchewan

Beauval CBC CBKBT 7 
Bellegarde SRC CBKFT-9 26 
Buffalo Narrows CBC CBKDT 11 
Cumberland House CBC CBWIT-2 9 
Cypress Hills CBC CBCP-TV-2 2 
Debden SRC CBKFT-3 22 
Fond Du Lac CBC CBKAT-2 10 
Fort Qu'Appelle CBC CBKT-3 4 
Gravelbourg CBC CBKGT 45 
Gravelbourg SRC CBKFT-6 39 
Greenwater Lake CBC CBKST-11 4 
Hudson Bay CBC CBKT-10 9 
Ile-Ó-la-Crosse CBC CBKCT 9 
Island Falls CBC CBWBT-2 7 
La Loche CBC CBKDT-2 13 
La Ronge CBC CBKST-2 12 
Leoville CBC CBKST-3 12 
Leoville SRC CBKFT-11 31 
Meadow Lake CBC CBCS-TV-1 8 
Montreal Lake CBC CBKST-5 11 
Moose Jaw CBC CBKT-1  4 
Moose Jaw SRC CBKFT-10 16 
Nipawin CBC CBKST-15 10 
Norquay CBC CBKT-9 13 
North Battleford CBC CBKST-10 7 
North Battleford SRC CBKFT-12 41 
Palmbere Lake CBC CBKDT-1 8 
Patuanak CBC CBKPT 5 
Pelican Narrows CBC CBWBT-3 5 
Pinehouse Lake CBC CBKST-6 10 
Ponteix CBC CBCP-TV-3 3 
Ponteix SRC CBKFT-7 22 
Prince Albert CBC CBKST-9 5 
Prince Albert SRC CBKFT-2 3 
Riverhurst CBC CBKT-5 10 
Saskatoon CBC CBKST  11 
Saskatoon SRC CBKFT-1 13 
Shaunavon CBC CBCP-TV-1 7 
Southend CBC CBKST-8 13 
Spiritwood CBC CBKST-13 2 
St Brieux SRC CBKFT-4 7 
Stanley Mission CBC CBKST-4 8 
Stony Rapids CBC CBKAT-3 7 
Stranraer CBC CBKST-1 9 
Swift Current CBC CBKT-4 5 
Uranium City CBC CBKAT 8 
Warmley CBC CBKT-7 3 
Willow Bunch CBC CBKT-2 10 
Willow Bunch SRC CBKFT-8 21 
Wynyard CBC CBKT-8 6 
Yorkton CBC CBKT-6 5 
Zenon Park SRC CBKFT-5 21

Yukon
Dawson CBC CBDDT 7 
Elsa CBC CBKHT-1 9 
Faro CBC CBDBT 8 
Mayo CBC CBKHT-2 7 
Watson Lake CBC CBDAT 8 
Whitehorse CBC CFWH-TV  6 
Whitehorse SRC CBFT-15 7

References

External links
CBC Television
Ici Radio-Canada Télé

Defunct television stations in Canada
2012 disestablishments in Canada